IBM SmartCloud for Social Business is a suite of business networking and collaboration cloud-based services hosted by the IBM Collaboration Solutions division of IBM. The integrated services include social networking for businesses, online meetings, file sharing, instant messaging, data visualization and e-mail.

There are several IBM SmartCloud for Social Business offerings:
 IBM SmartCloud Connections provides an integrated set of collaboration tools for creating user profiles, managing contacts, creating business networking with your contacts, instant messaging, social file sharing, managing collaborative tasks called "Activities," creating "Communities" and sending out surveys through the "Forms" application.
 IBM SmartCloud Meetings is a full-featured, web-based online meeting service, formerly known as Lotus Sametime Unyte Meeting.

 IBM SmartCloud Engage Standard combines the functionality of LotusLive Connections and LotusLive Meetings. It was code-named "Bluehouse" and was first announced at Lotusphere in January 2008.
 IBM SmartCloud Notes is a fully-featured e-mail, calendar, contact management, and instant messaging service in the IBM cloud. With LotusLive Notes, users access their mailbox over the Internet with a web browser or with the Lotus Notes client.
 IBM SmartCloud iNotes is a web-based e-mail and calendar service. It uses the messaging assets that IBM acquired from Outblaze, a Hong Kongbased online application service provider.

IBM SmartCloud for Social Business also provides framework for third-party applications to integrate with LotusLive. IBM has announced integration with Skype, LinkedIn, Salesforce, UPS, and Silanis.

At Lotusphere 2012, IBM announced that it has rebranded the LotusLive product line as IBM SmartCloud For Social Business.

Notes

External links
 IBM SmartCloud for Social Business Homepage
 Lotus Notes Hosted Messaging
 DeveloperWorks article on LotusLive
 DeveloperWorks article on LotusLive Engage

Cloud applications
Groupware
IBM cloud services
Lotus Software software